Rejdová (1551 Redowa, Neuhay, Nojhaus, 1552 Romokwagasa, Neuhau, 1556 Rejdowa, 1566 Redoua, Romokvaghasa, 1686 Resdowa) is a village and large municipality in the Rožňava District in the Košice Region of middle-eastern Slovakia.

History
In historical records the village was first mentioned in 1551 as Bebek knights family's property. German miners came here in the past.

Geography
The village lies at an altitude of 582 metres and covers an area of 50.518 km².
It has a population of about 710 people.

Culture
The village has a public library a gymnasium and a football pitch.

External links
http://www.statistics.sk/mosmis/eng/run.html
http://www.rejdova.sk/

Villages and municipalities in Rožňava District